Moling of Luachair was an Irish cleric and poet (fl. 695).

The Annals of Tigernach relate that upon the death of King Fínsnechta Fledach mac Dúnchada, Mo Ling Luachra do-rigni in rand-so ar Fínachta/Moling of Luachair made this stave on Finachta::

To this, Adomnán of Iona responded:

This in turn generated a final verse from Moling:

References

External links
 http://www.ucc.ie/celt/published/G100002/index.html
 http://www.ucc.ie/celt/published/T100002A/text011.html

Medieval Irish poets
7th-century Irish writers
7th-century Irish poets
Irish male poets
Irish-language writers